Lupe Chavira Contreras (born July 27, 1975) is a State Representative from Arizona, representing the 22nd district since 2023. He was previously a member of the Arizona Senate, representing the 19th district from 2015 to 2023. Prior to serving in the State Senate, Contreras was elected to the Arizona House of Representatives in 2013. Contreras served on the Federalism and Fiscal Responsibility Committee and the Judiciary Committee. He is a member of the Democratic Party.

References

External links
Profile at the Arizona Senate
Vote Smart page

1975 births
Living people
Hispanic and Latino American state legislators in Arizona
Hispanic and Latino American women in politics
People from Avondale, Arizona
Democratic Party Arizona state senators
21st-century American politicians